Crystal Caverns may refer to:

 Crystal Cavern, a small cave in Clay, Alabama, U.S.
 Sitting Bull Crystal Caverns, a cave complex near Rapid City, South Dakota, U.S.
 Crystal Caverns at Hupp's Hill, a former show cave near Strasburg, Virginia, U.S.
 Raccoon Mountain Caverns, a former name of Raccoon Mountain Caverns
 Crystal Caverns (video game)

See also
 Crystal Cave (disambiguation)